Casimirella is a genus of flowering plants belonging to the family Icacinaceae.

Its native range is Southern Tropical America.

Species:

Casimirella ampla 
Casimirella beckii 
Casimirella crispula 
Casimirella diversifolia 
Casimirella guaranitica 
Casimirella lanata 
Casimirella rupestris

References

Icacinaceae
Asterid genera